Rokycany is a town in the Plzeň Region of the Czech Republic. It has about 14,000 inhabitants. The town centre is well preserved and is protected by law as an urban monument zone.

Administrative parts
Rokycany is made up of town parts of Střed ("Centre"), Nové Město ("New Town") and Plzeňské předměstí ("Plzeň Suburb"), and the village of Borek.

Geography

It lies in the Švihov Highlands.

Rokycany is situated at the confluence of the Klabava River and Holoubkovský Brook. There is another smaller brook (Rakovský) which flows through the western part of the town. Today it serves as flood protection and as a recreational area. The second notable body of water is Borecký Pond.

History

The area was inhabited since the Stone Age. Celtic and early Slavic settlements were discovered. The first written mention of Rokycany is in Chronica Boemorum from 1110. At that time, the village was owned by the Bishop of Prague, and major Bohemian and German noblemen met here for diplomatic talks with Emperor Henry V.

At the end of the 13th century, bishop Tobiáš of Bechyně made from the settlement a market town and the episcopal court was replaced by episcopal castle. In the 14th century, the town fortification was made, few its fragments are preserved to this day. In 1406, Rokycany obtained town privileges. The town was a property of the church until the Hussite Wars. In 1421, the town was conquered by Jan Žižka's army, but later that year it was conquered, burned and looted by Plzeň's Catholics.

In 1436–1498, Rokycany was owned by Lords of Švamberk and in 1498, it was bought by King Vladislaus II. In 1584, it was promoted by Emperor Rudolf II to a royal town. The prosperity came to an abrupt end with the Thirty Years' War. Rokycany was repeatedly afflicted by various armies, most notably by the Swedish who almost completely burned the town. The town was among the most destroyed Bohemian towns. Thanks to the ironworks and woodworking industry, the town began to flourish again. However, two huge fires in 1757 and 1784 deprived the town of its medieval character. Almost everything was destroyed, including municipal buildings, the town hall and the church.

Thanks to favorable economic conditions of the residents the post-1784 renewal proceeded rather quickly. In the 1840s, it again became one of the most richest Bohemian towns. In the 19th century the traditional iron-ore mining and processing industry became main source of Rokycany's economy. In 1862 Rokycany was connected via railway with Prague and Plzeň. Industrial development continued for most of the 20th century.

On 7 May 1945, Rokycany was liberated by the United States Army which halted its eastward advance here, meeting with the allied Soviet troops in the eastern part of the town (creating the so-called demarcation line). It was the very first meeting of United States Army and Soviet Army in Czechoslovakia.

In the post-World War II era, the development of the town was carried out in line with the ruling communist regime. The new massive construction activity focused on uniform tenement houses, from the 1960s built with concrete panels (so-called "panelák"). The local industry was further expanded and the life of the town was strongly influenced by strong army garrison (located in two barracks built in 1899 and 1933 respectively). In 1960 neighbouring municipality of Borek was merged with Rokycany, in 1980 another three municipalities (Kamenný Újezd, Svojkovice and Litohlavy) joined Rokycany (however the first two have separated in 1990 and Litohlavy in 1994).

Demographics

In 19th century Rokycany's population quickly expanded pushing the number of inhabitants towards 5,000 in 1880. In the wake of Long Depression (economic slowdown of the 1870s which affected the economy of Austria-Hungary) the growth stopped. In late 1890s however population began to expand again, only to halt during World War I. In post-1918 era Rokycany grew rapidly. In the late 1930s this growth was further spurred by influx of ethnic Czech refugees from Sudetenland. In 1939 Rokycany's population touched 10,000 mark briefly. After World War II many citizens of Rokycany left the town for border regions from where the ethnic Germans were expelled. From the 1950s a new wave of massive growth started, pushing the town's population past 10,000 in the mid 1950s and past 15,000 in the 1980s.

Ethnically, Rokycany has been a predominately Czech settlement since Middle Ages. The German minority accounted for no more than couple of dozens individuals. In 1938 the town's population was boosted by influx of ethnic Czechs fleeing the border regions of Czechoslovakia which had been ceded to Nazi Germany. After 1945 most ethnic Germans were expelled. The ethnic mix of Rokycany was in the post-World War II era enriched by Romani and Slovaks.

Economy
The largest employer with its headquarters in the town is a branch of the Hutchinson SA. It is engaged in the production of rubber products.

Transport

The town is located on a train line leading from Prague to Plzeň. There is a train station which is served by regional and longer-distance trains.

The D5 motorway passes through the northern part of the territory.

Culture
Rokycany hosts Fluff Fest, a vegan hardcore punk festival which draws several thousand visitors from across Europe every July. It is held at the Rokycany airfield, having moved there in 2006 from its original location in Plzeň. The festival has been described as a yearly "strain" on the town, which is otherwise unaccustomed to large numbers of foreign visitors and extreme music adherents, and brings a business boom especially in sales of vegetarian and vegan food.

Sights
The Masarykovo Square is in the historical core of Rokycany and contains most of town's cultural monuments. The town hall is a Baroque building by architect Ignác Jan Nepomuk Palliardi from 1804–1808. The stone Baroque fountain from 1827 stands in front of the so-called "Rokycan's House of Enlightenment". In the mid-19th century, this Neo-Renaissance building and the town hall were two only two-storey houses in the square.

The Church of Our Lady of the Snows is located in the northeastern part of the square. It stands on the place of the episcopal court, mentioned already in 1110. It was built in the Gothic style in the 14th century. After a large fire, it was rebuilt in the Neoclasical style by Palliardi in 1785–1788.

The Dumet's House next to the church was first mentioned in 1512, however it probably exists much longer. In 1784–1787 it served as a school, but it burned down. Nowadays it has a Rococo façade with stucco decoration.

Notable people

Jan Rokycana (c. 1396–1471), archbishop of Prague
Antonín Kraft (1749–1820), cellist and composer
Adolf Kraus (1850–1928), Chicago lawyer, B'nai B'rith officer; lived here
Paula Deppe (1886–1922), Sudeten German painter
Čestmír Řanda (1923–1986), actor
Ivan Kusnjer (born 1951), opera singer
Věra Bílá (1954–2019), singer
Jiří Pehe (born 1955), political analyst and writer
Jaroslav Špaček (born 1974), ice hockey player
Vhrsti (born 1975), illustrator
Václav Procházka (born 1984), footballer

Twin towns – sister cities

Rokycany is twinned with:
 Greiz, Germany
 Pfinztal, Germany

Gallery

References

External links

 
History of the town, its current state

Cities and towns in the Czech Republic
Populated places in Rokycany District